Featurepics was a royalty-free microstock photography digital content agency that has been actively working in the stock photography market since 2007 based in Fremont, California.

Featurepics has successfully developed solid and efficient content library of over 3 million royalty-free photographs, vector images, illustrations as well as an established network of partners across the media industry. Featurepics utilizes a unique business model is to provide users with an inventory of high-quality images licensed for specific uses (Royalty-free, publications, software, etc.). Featurepics provides content API portal to distribute a variety of stock photos with helpful HTML codes for linking across individual images and entire portfolios. With the help from its contributors the site categorizes graphics media to provide designers with variety of resources, from basic stock content to custom graphics concepts  in direct competition with Shutterstock and Alamy agencies.

See also
 Stock photography

References

External links 
 Featurepics Website

Stock photography
Photo archives in the United States
Companies based in California